Nocloa duplicatus is a species of moth in the family Noctuidae (the owlet moths).

The MONA or Hodges number for Nocloa duplicatus is 9801.

References

Further reading

 
 
 

Amphipyrinae
Articles created by Qbugbot
Moths described in 1891